Friedrich Georg Carl (Friedrich) Gaedcke (5 June 1828 – 19 September 1890) was a German chemist. He was the first person to isolate the cocaine alkaloid in 1855.

Gaedcke named the alkaloid “erythroxyline,” and published a description in the journal Archiv der Pharmazie.

Gaedcke worked in a pharmacy in Rostock and studied in Rostock between 1850 and 1851. In 1856, he took over a pharmacy in Dömitz which he ran for 3
4 years.

References

1828 births
1890 deaths
19th-century German chemists
People from Rostock